Kozmodemyanovka is a rural locality (a selo) and the administrative center of Kozmodemyanovsky Selsoviet of Tambovsky District, Amur Oblast, Russia. The population was 1,482 as of 2018. There are 9 streets.

Geography 
Kozmodemyanovka is located on the Gilchin River, 18 km northeast of Tambovka (the district's administrative centre) by road. Chuyevka is the nearest rural locality.

References 

Rural localities in Tambovsky District, Amur Oblast